Riau may refer to:

Locations in Indonesia:
 Riau Archipelago or Riau Islands, part of the Riau Islands Province
 Riau Province 
 Riau Islands Province

Political organisations:
 Revolutionary Insurrectionary Army of Ukraine

Historically:
 Riau-Lingga Sultanate, a Malay Sultanate that once governed Riau-Lingga Archipelago
 Riau Residency, administrative unit of the Dutch East Indies

Other uses:
 Riau Airlines
 Riau University
 Miguel Ángel Riau